Kenneth Timmy Hansen (born 21 May 1992) is a rallycross driver from Sweden. He won the 2019 FIA World Rallycross Championship  in the FIA World Rallycross Championship, driving for Team Peugeot-Hansen. His father is the 14-times European Rallycross Champion Kenneth Hansen, his mother the 1994 ERA European Cup (Group N up to 1400cc) winner Susann Hansen (née Bergvall), and his brother rallycross driver Kevin Hansen.

Career start

Hansen has won the Swedish Karting Championship in 2008 and has won races in Formula BMW, Formula Renault 2.0 Alps and the Eurocup Formula Renault 2.0. In April 2011 he drove his first ever rallycross event at Dreux in France with a by MTechnologies lent Citroën Xsara Supercar of Marc Laboulle, that was previously used by Davy Jeanney to claim the French 2010 championship title. In 2012 his father offered him a one-off drive in the FIA European Rallycross Championship, the Finnish ERX round at Kouvola saw him driving the 2012 X Games winning car of Sébastien Loeb to an impressive 5th place overall. After he gave up single seater racing Hansen junior started his rallycross career by taking part in the entire 2013 Euro RX series, after nine rounds finishing in 3rd place overall.

World RX

For 2014 Hansen was partnered by former European Rallycross Championship title winner Timur Timerzyanov at his father's team to enter the inaugural season of World RX.

Hansen took one win and a further three podium finishes in the 2014 FIA World Rallycross Championship season and would finish the year with 199 points and fourth place in the championship standings while Timerzyanov finished in seventh with one podium.

For the 2015 season it was announced that he would be driving alongside Davy Jeanney for the Team Peugeot-Hansen team in their new Peugeot 208 WRX. Hansen took three wins on his way to second in the championship behind Petter Solberg.

For 2016 Hansen partners with 9-time WRC champion Sébastien Loeb at Hansen Motorsport. Jeanney moved to the team's second outfit Peugeot Hansen Academy, alongside Timmy's younger brother Kevin. He won a race and collected six podiums, which put him sixth in the overall standings.

Racing record

Circuit racing career summary

Complete FIA European Rallycross Championship results
(key)

Supercar

Complete FIA World Rallycross Championship results
(key)

Supercar/RX1/RX1e

† 10 championship points deducted for use of an unregistered tyre in Q3.
‡ Fifteen championship points deducted for use of a fourth engine in the championship.

Complete Extreme E results
(key)

* Season still in progress.

References

External links

1992 births
Living people
Swedish racing drivers
European Rallycross Championship drivers
World Rallycross Championship drivers
Extreme E drivers
People from Lidköping Municipality
Sportspeople from Västra Götaland County
Formula BMW Europe drivers
Formula Abarth drivers
Formula Renault Eurocup drivers
Formula Renault 2.0 Alps drivers
RP Motorsport drivers
Andretti Autosport drivers
United Autosports drivers
Mücke Motorsport drivers
Peugeot Sport drivers